Vassilis Ragoussis (born 1993) is a Greek-British rower.

Profile
While studying at Abingdon School, Ragoussis gained colours for the Abingdon School Boat Club. He was part of the team that won the gold medal at the National Schools Regatta and also the Princess Elizabeth Cup at the Henley Royal Regatta. After leaving Abingdon in 2011 he attended Boston University and Linacre College, Oxford.

Rowing
In 2017, Ragousssis was selected in the stroke seat of the Oxford boat at the 2017 Boat Race, along with fellow Old Abingdonians Oliver Cook and Jamie Cook. Oxford went on to win the race.

He was selected again in 2018 for the Oxford crew which ended with a win for Cambridge.

He has also represented Great Britain at the 2011 World Rowing Junior Championships at Eton in England.  In 2016, he earned Bronze at the Eastern Sprints in the Boston University 2V.

References

1993 births
Living people
People educated at Abingdon School
English male rowers
Alumni of Linacre College, Oxford